The Nasozai  are a Pashtun tribe.  They are largely literate. Nasozai is the second largest and most important mohallah of the village of Nartopa in Attock District, Punjab, Pakistan, naming that part of the village after their tribe. The people of Nasozai migrated from Afghanistan (Nasozai) to Chhachh, Attock District in 1723. 

Gharghashti Pashtun tribes
Pashto-language surnames
Pakistani names